Astro Kid is a 2019 French computer-animated science-fiction film directed and written by Éric Tosti with the participation of the co-writers David Alaux and Jean-François Tosti. The plot concerns ten-year-old Willy, who, after the destruction of his ship, gets separated from his parents and lands on an unexplored planet, where he must survive until the arrival of a rescue mission.

Synopsis 
Following the destruction of their ship, young Willy is separated from his parents with whom he traveled through space. His rescue capsule lands on a wild and unexplored planet. With the help of Buck, a survival robot, he will have to hold on until the arrival of a rescue mission. Meanwhile, Willy, Buck and Flash, a dog-like alien in which they befriended, are discovering the planet, its fauna, its flora but also its dangers.

Production
Terra Willy is the second feature film from the Toulouse-based studio TAT Productions to be released in theatres,  after The Jungle Bunch. Shortly after his previous film release in July 2017, TAT announced its production of Astro Kid with a team of 70 people and having a budget of 6,000,000 euros.

The movie was animated using 3ds Max and rendered using VRay. Some of render tests had used Substance Designer on their own for textures, and the team decided to go for 3ds Max pipeline mainly based on the most common plugins like  Ornatrix and Forest. However the studio only have three developers for internal tools that are mostly used for plugging any holes in the usage design of the forest planet to use UDIMs for the first time, with Substance Painter being adapted into a new way of working  and resulting in load all the UDIMs and be able to bake all the maps in one place alongside UV and surfacing on ZBrush to later being exported to Autodesk software alongside materials for the hard surfacing, for metals, paints, plastics, rubbers and background props modeling department.

Voice cast

English Dub 
Landen Beattie as Willy
Jason Canning as Buck
Susan Myers as Probe
Laura Post as Willy's Mother
Keith Sliverstein as Willy's Father

French Dub 
 as Willy
Édouard Baer as Buck
 as Probe
 as Willy's Mother
 as Willy's Father

Reception 

See also 
List of films with a 100% rating on Rotten Tomatoes
The Jungle Bunch (film)–the previous feature film by TAT Productions

References

External links 
Official website

2019 films
2019 computer-animated films
2010s children's adventure films
2010s science fiction adventure films
2010s French animated films
2010s science fiction comedy films
French animated feature films
French children's films
Fictional robots
Films set in the future
Films set on fictional planets